Sinsa-dong may refer to:

 Sinsa-dong, Gangnam, Gangnam District, Seoul
 Sinsa-dong, Gwanak, Gwanak District, Seoul
 Sinsa-dong, Eunpyeong, Eunpyeong District, Seoul